King Manisarus (died c. 115 AD) was a 2nd-century king of the Corduene, which was a small vassal state during the Roman Empire. He has also been described as "perhaps prince of the Praetavi, whose capital was Singara". During his rule he took control over parts of Armenia and Mesopotamia, and Osroes I of Parthia declared war on him. Manisarus petitioned the Roman Emperor Trajan, offering him territory taken from supporters of Osroes in return for his support, an offer which was evidently accepted. Trajan also acquired the kingdom of Corduene at this time but only temporarily.

References

External links
Corduene or Gordyene, Classical Dictionary of Biography, Mythology and Geography.
Geography, Strabo, Book XVI, Chapter 1, Section 24.
 History of Rome, The Establishment of the Military Monarchy, by Theodor Mommsen, page 24.

Roman client rulers